The Germania C.IV was a two-seat general-purpose biplane built by Germania Flugzeugwerke during World War I.

Design and development
The C.IV was built as a small spotter reconnaissance aircraft wooden construction with fabric covering. No armament was installed on the aircraft. The Luftsreitkräfte did not accept the aircraft and the C.IV was converted into a trainer with dual control, eventually being transferred to a flight school.

Specifications

See also

References

Bibliography
 Angelucci, Enzo. The Rand McNally Encyclopedia of Military Aircraft, 1914-1980. San Diego, California:  The Military Press, 1983. .
 Cowin, H.W. German and Austrian Aviation of World War I. Oxford, UK: Osprey Publishing Ltd, 2000. .
 Gray, Peter and Owen Thetford. German aircraft of the First World War. London: Putnam, 1970, 2nd edition. .
 van Wyngarden, G. Early German Aces of World War I. Oxford, UK: Osprey Publishing Ltd, 2006. 

Biplanes
Single-engined tractor aircraft
1910s German military reconnaissance aircraft
Military aircraft of World War I
C.04
Aircraft first flown in 1918